Worldwide Responsible Accredited Production (WRAP), formerly Worldwide Responsible Apparel Production is an organization whose stated aim is promoting safe, lawful, humane and ethical manufacturing around the world. It certifies factories according to twelve "Worldwide Responsible Apparel Production Principles". The organization was established in 2000 by the American Apparel and Footwear Association. By 2008 it had certified 1700 factories in 60 countries, and issued 1100 certificates in that year. In February 2018, WRAP became the official Corporate Social Responsibility partner of the American Apparel and Footwear Association. 

Its work has been described by commentators as undermining that of local labor rights organizations in the global south. In the early 2000s, some organizations advocating against sweatshops described WRAP as an industry-driven effort to avoid scrutiny.

References

External links

Clothing-related organizations
Auditing organizations
Production and manufacturing
501(c)(6) nonprofit organizations